TLC is a Swedish television channel. Its primary target is women between 25 and 49. It launched on 2 December 2010, replacing Discovery Travel & Living Europe in Sweden.

It is the second dedicated Swedish channel from Discovery Networks after Discovery Channel Sweden. Prior to the launch of the dedicated TLC channel for Sweden, its predecessors had been available in Sweden for over a decade.

Following Discovery's acquisition of SBS Nordic in 2013, TLC Sweden became a part of SBS Discovery Media with five dedicated TV channels for Sweden. From 15 January 2014 the channel dramatically increased its reach by joining the analogue line-up of Com Hem, the country's leading cable network.

References

Television channels and stations established in 2010
Television channels in Sweden
Sweden
2010 establishments in Sweden
Warner Bros. Discovery EMEA